The 1991 Davidson Wildcats football team represented Davidson College as an independent during the 1991 NCAA Division III football season. Led by sixth-year head coach Dave Fagg, the Wildcats compiled an overall record of 4–5.

Schedule

References

Davidson
Davidson Wildcats football seasons
Davidson Wildcats football